The Little Net River is a  tributary of the Net River of Minnesota, part of the Nemadji River watershed flowing to Lake Superior.

See also
List of rivers of Minnesota

References

Minnesota Watersheds
USGS Hydrologic Unit Map - State of Minnesota (1974)

Rivers of Minnesota
Tributaries of Lake Superior